François Duvalier (14 April 190721 April 1971), also known as Papa Doc, was a Haitian politician of French Martiniquan descent who served as the President of Haiti from 1957 until his death. He was elected president in the 1957 general election on a populist and black nationalist platform. After thwarting a military coup d'état in 1958, his regime rapidly became more autocratic and despotic. An undercover government death squad, the Tonton Macoute, indiscriminately killed Duvalier's opponents; the Tonton Macoute was thought to be so pervasive that Haitians became highly fearful of expressing any form of dissent, even in private. Duvalier further sought to solidify his rule by incorporating elements of Haitian mythology into a personality cult.

Prior to his rule, Duvalier was a physician by profession. He graduated from the Graduate School of Public Health at the University of Michigan on a scholarship that was meant to train Black doctors from the Caribbean to take care of African-American servicemen during World War II. Due to his profession and expertise in the medical field, he acquired the nickname "Papa Doc". He was unanimously "re-elected" in a 1961 presidential election in which he was the only candidate. Afterwards, he consolidated his power step by step, culminating in 1964 when he declared himself President for Life after another sham election, and as a result, he remained in power until his death in April 1971. He was succeeded by his son, Jean‑Claude, who was nicknamed "Baby Doc".

Early life and career
Duvalier was born in Port-au-Prince in 1907, the son of Duval Duvalier, a justice of the peace, and baker  His aunt, Madame Florestal, raised him. He completed a degree in medicine from the University of Haiti in 1934, and served as staff physician at several local hospitals. He spent a year at the University of Michigan studying public health and in 1943, became active in a United States–sponsored campaign to control the spread of contagious tropical diseases, helping the poor to fight typhus, yaws, malaria and other tropical diseases that had ravaged Haiti for years. His patients affectionately called him "Papa Doc", a moniker that he used throughout his life.

The racism and violence that occurred during the United States occupation of Haiti, which began in 1915, inspired black nationalism among Haitians and left a powerful impression on the young Duvalier. He was also aware of the latent political power of the poor black majority and their resentment against the small mulatto (black and white mixed-race) elite. Duvalier supported Pan-African ideals, and became involved in the  movement of Haitian author , both of which led to his advocacy of Haitian Vodou, an ethnological study of which later paid enormous political dividends for him. In 1938, Duvalier co-founded the journal Les Griots. On 27 December 1939, he married , with whom he had four children: Marie‑Denise, Nicole, Simone, and Jean‑Claude.

Political rise
In 1946, Duvalier aligned himself with President Dumarsais Estimé and was appointed Director General of the National Public Health Service. In 1949, he served as Minister of Health and Labor, but when Duvalier opposed Paul Magloire's 1950 coup d'état, he left the government and resumed practicing medicine. His practice included taking part in campaigns to prevent yaws and other diseases. In 1954, Duvalier abandoned medicine, hiding out in Haiti's countryside from the Magloire regime. In 1956, the Magloire government was failing, and although still in hiding, Duvalier announced his candidacy to replace him as president. By December 1956, an amnesty was issued and Duvalier emerged from hiding, and on 12 December 1956, Magloire conceded defeat.

The two frontrunners in the 1957 campaign for the presidency were Duvalier and Louis Déjoie, a landowner and industrialist from the north. During their campaigning, Haiti was ruled by five temporary administrations, none lasting longer than a few months. Duvalier promised to rebuild and renew the country and rural Haiti solidly supported him as did the military. 
He resorted to  populism, stoking the majority  irritation at being governed by the few mulatto elite, which is how he described his opponent, Déjoie.

François Duvalier was elected president on 22 September 1957. Duvalier received 679,884 votes to Déjoie's 266,992. Even in this election, however, there are multiple first-hand accounts of voter fraud and voter

Presidency

Consolidation of power
After being elected president in 1957, Duvalier exiled most of the major supporters of Déjoie.  He had a new constitution adopted that year.

Duvalier promoted and installed members of the black majority in the civil service and the army. In July 1958, three exiled Haitian army officers and five American mercenaries landed in Haiti and tried to overthrow Duvalier; all were killed. Although the army and its leaders had quashed the coup attempt, the incident deepened Duvalier's distrust of the army, an important Haitian institution over which he did not have firm control. He replaced the chief-of-staff with a more reliable officer and then proceeded to create his own power base within the army by turning the Presidential Guard into an elite corps aimed at maintaining his power. After this, Duvalier dismissed the entire general staff and replaced it with officers who owed their positions, and their loyalty, to him. 

In 1959, Duvalier created a rural militia, the —commonly referred to as the  after a  bogeyman—to extend and bolster support for the regime in the countryside. The Macoute, which by 1961 was twice as big as the army, never developed into a real military force but was more than just a secret police.

In the early years of his rule, Duvalier was able to take advantage of the strategic weaknesses of his powerful opponents, mostly from the mulatto elite. These weaknesses included their inability to coordinate their actions against the regime, whose power had grown increasingly stronger.

In the name of nationalism, Duvalier expelled almost all of Haiti's foreign-born bishops, an act that earned him excommunication from the Catholic Church. In 1966, he persuaded the Holy See to allow him permission to nominate the Catholic hierarchy for Haiti. Duvalier now exercised more power in Haiti than ever.

Heart attack and Barbot affair
On 24 May 1959, Duvalier suffered a massive heart attack, possibly due to an insulin overdose; he had been a diabetic since early adulthood and also suffered from heart disease and associated circulatory problems. During the heart attack, he was comatose for  His physician believed that he had suffered neurological damage during these events, harming his mental health and perhaps explaining his subsequent actions.

Upon his return to work, Duvalier accused Barbot of trying to supplant him as president and had him imprisoned. In April 1963, Barbot was released and began plotting to remove Duvalier from office by kidnapping his children. The plot failed and Duvalier then ordered a nationwide search for Barbot and his fellow conspirators. During the search, Duvalier was told that Barbot had transformed himself into a black dog, which prompted Duvalier to order that all black dogs in Haiti be put to death. The  captured and killed Barbot in July 1963. In other incidents, Duvalier ordered the head of an executed rebel packed in ice and brought to him so he could commune with the dead man's spirit. Peepholes were carved into the walls of the interrogation chambers, through which Duvalier watched Haitian detainees being tortured and submerged in baths of sulfuric acid; sometimes, he was in the room during the torture.

Constitutional changes
In 1961, Duvalier began violating the provisions of the 1957 constitution. First, he replaced the bicameral legislature with a unicameral body. Then he called a new presidential election in which he was the sole candidate, though his term was to expire in 1963 and the constitution prohibited re-election. The election was flagrantly rigged; the official tally showed a total of 1,320,748 "yes" votes for another term for Duvalier, with none opposed. Upon hearing the results, he proclaimed, "I accept the people's will. ... As a revolutionary, I have no right to disregard the will of the  The New York Times commented, "Latin America has witnessed many fraudulent elections throughout its history but none has been more outrageous than the one which has just taken place in Haiti". On 14 June 1964, a constitutional referendum made Duvalier "", a title previously held by seven Haitian presidents. This referendum was also blatantly rigged; an implausible 99.9% voted in favor, which should have come as no surprise since all the ballots were premarked "yes".

Foreign relations
His relationship with the United States proved difficult. In his early years, Duvalier rebuked the United States for its friendly relations with Dominican dictator Rafael Trujillo (assassinated in 1961) while ignoring Haiti. The U.S. thus halted most of its economic assistance in mid-1962, pending stricter accounting procedures, with which Duvalier refused to comply. Duvalier publicly renounced all aid from Washington on nationalist grounds, portraying himself as a "principled and lonely opponent of domination by a 

Duvalier misappropriated millions of dollars of international aid, including US$15 million annually from the United States. He transferred this money to personal accounts. Another of Duvalier's methods of obtaining foreign money was to gain foreign loans, including US$4 million from 

After the assassination of John F. Kennedy in November 1963, which Duvalier later claimed resulted from a curse that he had placed on Kennedy, the U.S. eased its pressure on Duvalier, grudgingly accepting him as a bulwark against communism. Duvalier attempted to exploit tensions between the U.S. and Cuba, emphasizing his anti-communist credentials and Haiti's strategic location as a means of winning U.S. support:

After Fulgencio Batista (a friend of Duvalier) was overthrown in the Cuban Revolution, Duvalier worried that new Cuban leader Fidel Castro would provide a safe haven for Haitian dissidents. Duvalier attempted to win Cuba over by recognizing Castro's government by sending medicine and pardoning several political prisoners, but to no avail; from the very start of his regime, Castro gave anti-Duvalier dissidents his full support.

Duvalier enraged Castro by voting against the country in an Organization of American States () meeting and subsequently at the United Nations, where a trade embargo was imposed on Cuba. Cuba answered by breaking off diplomatic relations and Duvalier subsequently instituted a campaign to rid Haiti of communists. This move severed Haitian relations with Cuba for 38 years until the two countries re-established relations in 1997.

Duvalier's relationship with the neighboring Dominican Republic was always tense: in his early years, Duvalier emphasized the differences between the two countries. In April 1963, relations were brought to the edge of war by the political enmity between Duvalier and Dominican president Juan Bosch. Bosch, a leftist, provided asylum and support to Haitian exiles who had plotted against the Duvalier regime. Duvalier ordered his Presidential Guard to occupy the Dominican Embassy in Pétion-Ville, with the goal of arresting a Haitian army officer believed to have been involved in Barbot's plot to kidnap Duvalier's children. The Dominican president reacted with outrage, publicly threatened to invade Haiti, and ordered army units to the border. However, as Dominican military commanders expressed little support for an invasion of Haiti, Bosch refrained from the invasion and sought mediation through 

In 1966, Duvalier hosted the emperor of Ethiopia, Haile Selassie I, in what would be the only visit of a foreign head of state to Haiti under Duvalier. During the visit, the two discussed bilateral agreements between their two nations and the economic shortcomings brought about by international pressure. Duvalier awarded Haile Selassie the Necklace of the Order of Jean-Jacques Dessalines the Great, and the emperor, in turn, bestowed upon Duvalier the Great Necklace of the Order of the Queen of Sheba.

Internal policies

Repression

Duvalier's government was one of the most repressive in the Western Hemisphere. Within the country he murdered and exiled his opponents; estimates of those killed are as high as 60,000. Attacks on Duvalier from within the military were treated as especially serious. When bombs were detonated near the Presidential Palace in 1967, Duvalier had nineteen officers of the Presidential Guard executed in Fort Dimanche. A few days later Duvalier gave a public speech during which he read the attendance sheet with names of all 19 officers killed. After each name, he said "absent". After reading the whole list, Duvalier remarked that "all were shot".

Haitian communists and even suspected communists bore the brunt of the government's repression. Duvalier targeted them to reassure the U.S. he was not communist: Duvalier was exposed to communist and leftist ideas early in his life and rejected them. On 28 April 1969, Duvalier instituted a campaign to rid Haiti of all communists. A new law declared that "Communist activities, no matter what their form, are hereby declared crimes against the security of the State." Those convicted of Communist activity were subject to execution, and faced having their property confiscated.

Social and economic policies
Duvalier employed intimidation, repression, and patronage to supplant the old mulatto elites with a new elite of his own making. Corruption—in the form of government rake-offs of industries, bribery, extortion of domestic businesses, and stolen government funds—enriched the dictator's closest supporters. Most of them held sufficient power to intimidate the members of the old elite, who were gradually co-opted or eliminated.

Many educated professionals fled Haiti for New York City, Miami, Montreal, Paris and several French-speaking African countries, exacerbating an already serious lack of doctors and teachers. Some of the highly skilled professionals joined the ranks of several  agencies to work in development in newly independent nations such as Ivory Coast, and the Congo.

The government confiscated peasant landholdings and allotted them to members of the militia, who had no official salary and made their living through crime and  The dispossessed fled to the slums of the capital where they would find only meager incomes to feed themselves. Malnutrition and famine became endemic.

Nonetheless, Duvalier enjoyed significant support among Haiti's majority black rural population, who saw in him a champion of their claims against the historically dominant mulatto elite. During his 14 years in power, he created a substantial black middle class, chiefly through government patronage.

Personality cult and Vodou
Duvalier fostered his cult of personality and claimed that he was the physical embodiment of the island nation. He also revived the traditions of Vodou, later using them to consolidate his power with his claim of being a Vodou priest himself. In an effort to make himself even more imposing, Duvalier deliberately modeled his image on that of Baron Samedi, one of the lwa, or spirits, of Haitian Vodou. He often donned sunglasses in order to hide his eyes and talked with the strong nasal tone associated with the lwa. The regime's propaganda stated that "Papa Doc was one with the lwa, Jesus Christ and God himself". The most celebrated image from the time shows a standing Jesus Christ with a hand on the shoulder of a seated Papa Doc, captioned, "I have chosen him". Duvalier declared himself an "immaterial being" as well as "the Haitian flag" soon after his first election. In 1964, he published a catechism in which the Lord's Prayer was heavily reworded to praise Duvalier instead of God.

Duvalier also held in his closet the head of former opponent Blucher Philogenes, who tried to overthrow him in 1963. He believed another political enemy, Clément Barbot, was able to change at will into a black dog and had the militia begin killing black dogs on sight in the capital.

Death and succession
François Duvalier died of heart disease and diabetes on 21 April 1971, seven days after his 64th birthday. His 19-year-old son , nicknamed "Baby Doc", succeeded him as president.

On February 8, 1986, when the Duvalier regime fell, a crowd attacked Duvalier's mausoleum, throwing boulders at it, chipping off pieces from it, and breaking open the crypt. Duvalier's coffin was not inside, however. A prevailing rumor in the capital, according to The New York Times, was that his son had removed his remains upon fleeing to the United States in an Air Force transport plane the day before.

Books and films
Many books have been written about the Duvalier Era in Haiti, the best known of which is Graham Greene's novel The Comedians. Duvalier, however, dismissed the piece and referred to its author as "a cretin, a stool pigeon, sadistic, unbalanced, perverted, a perfect , lying to his heart's content, the shame of proud and noble England, a spy, a drug addict, and a torturer". The book was later made into a film. Greene himself was declared  and barred from entering Haiti.

Alan Whicker featured Duvalier in a 1969 episode of Whicker's World, which included an interview with the president. Made by Yorkshire Television, the documentary is deeply revealing of Duvalier's character and of the state of Haiti in 1969.

The first authoritative book on the subject was Papa Doc: Haiti and its Dictator by Al Burt and Bernard Diederich, published in 1969, though several others by Haitian scholars and historians have appeared since Duvalier's death in 1971. One of the most informative, Patrick Lemoine's Fort‑Dimanche: Dungeon of Death, dealt specifically with victims of Fort Dimanche, the prison which Duvalier used for the torture and murder of his political opponents.

In 2007, John Marquis wrote Papa Doc: Portrait of a Haitian Tyrant, which relied in part on records from a 1968 espionage trial in Haiti to detail numerous attempts on Duvalier's life. The trial's defendant, David Knox, was a Bahamian director of information. Knox lost and was sentenced to death, but he was later granted amnesty.

In the season one episode, "Only Child," of The CW's anthology horror series Two Sentence Horror Stories, a Haitian grandmother living in America learns her grandson is possessed by the evil spirit of Papa Doc. He's also controlling his parents - her son and daughter-in-law - making them his new Tonton Macoute.

See also
 Fidel Castro
 Cuba–Haiti Maritime Boundary Agreement
 French Haitians 
 The King of Haiti 
 Crime in Haiti
 Bokor
 Guede Nibo
 Haitian Americans
 Newkirk Avenue–Little Haiti station
 Louis XIV of Louisiana

References

External links 
 

1907 births
1950s in Haiti
1960s in Haiti
1970s in Haiti
1971 deaths
20th-century Haitian politicians
20th-century Haitian writers
20th-century non-fiction writers
African and Black nationalists
Articles containing video clips
Deaths from diabetes
Francois
Genocide perpetrators
Haitian criminals
20th-century criminals
People indicted for crimes against humanity
State University of Haiti alumni
Haitian anti-communists
Haitian non-fiction writers
Haitian physicians
Haitian public health doctors
Haitian Vodou practitioners
National Unity Party (Haiti) politicians
People excommunicated by the Catholic Church
People from Port-au-Prince
Politicide perpetrators
Presidents for life
Presidents of Haiti
University of Michigan School of Public Health alumni
Recipients of orders, decorations, and medals of Ethiopia